"I Cover the Waterfront" is a 1933 popular song and jazz standard composed by Johnny Green with lyrics by Edward Heyman. The song was inspired by Max Miller's 1932 best-selling novel, I Cover the Waterfront.

Recordings and interpretations
The song became popular, and many artists have recorded it since 1933. Notable artists include: 
Billie Holiday
Frank Sinatra
Sarah Vaughan
Annette Hanshaw
Abe Lyman's California Ambassador Hotel Orchestra
Connee Boswell
Harry James
The Lester Young Trio with Nat King Cole
Ray Conniff recorded the song in 1958, and was included on his "Awful Nice" LP.
Buddy Rich
Louis Armstrong
Years later, Ella Fitzgerald recorded this song in her 1979 live album Digital III at Montreux on Pablo Records.  
Annie Lennox gave her interpretation of the song on her 2014 studio album Nostalgia.
John Lee Hooker recorded several versions of the song. One appears on the 1991 compilation The Ultimate Collection and another with Van Morrison on Hooker's 1991 album Mr. Lucky. Hooker's versions make such changes from the original melody and lyrics that his label credits him as the songwriter.
In 2017, the musicians Chris Thile and Brad Mehldau collaborated on an album recording of the track.

Film role
A 1933 motion picture, also inspired by Miller's book and also titled I Cover the Waterfront, was re-scored at the last minute to include the tune. Sheet music publishers later used the film's success by claiming that the song was "[i]nspired by the United Artist Picture of the same name".

Radio program theme
I Cover the Waterfront was the theme for the Johnny Modero, Pier 23 radio program, which starred Jack Webb and was broadcast on the Mutual Broadcasting System in 1947.

Popular culture
R&B/soul singer/actress Miki Howard, portraying Billie Holiday, performed the song in the 1992 bio film Malcolm X.

See also
List of 1930s jazz standards

References

1933 songs
1930s jazz standards
Songs with music by Johnny Green
Songs with lyrics by Edward Heyman
Billie Holiday songs
John Lee Hooker songs
Jazz compositions in G major